Majlis Alam, was a minister (Dastur) of Srihat (Sylhet) from 1472 to 1476, during the reign of Shamsuddin Yusuf Shah, the Sultan of Bengal of the Ilyas Shahi dynasty.

Background
Alam was the son of Musa ibn Haji Amir Khan. According to the Rajmala, his grandfather, Haji Amir Khan, was an army commander for Sultan Rukunuddin Barbak Shah and governed parts of Tripura. Majlis Alam was a common rank and title given by the Sultanate to a number of people and so the minister's real name is unknown.

Life
Alam was known to have established many mosques throughout Sylhet. In 1472, he erected a replica of Pandua's Adina Mosque in Chowkidekhi (Chowkidighi Mahalla). This mosque would be destroyed by a later ruler of Sylhet, Isfandiyar Khan Beg, in the 1660s. The inscriptions here refers to himself as the Great Majlis, the Minister, the Messenger towards goodness. In 1476, Alam and his father also constructed the Goyghor Mosque in present-day Moulvibazar. He may have also constructed a small mosque in Choti Dargah in Hazrat Pandua in 1479 as the builder of that mosque goes by "Majlis al-Majālis Majlis Aʿlā".

See also
Haydar Ghazi
History of Sylhet
Lutfullah Shirazi

References

Rulers of Sylhet
15th-century rulers in Asia
15th-century Indian Muslims
Bengal Sultanate officers